"Strobelite" is a single by British virtual band Gorillaz, released on their fifth studio album Humanz. It features guest vocals by Peven Everett. The single was released on 4 August 2017, with an accompanying music video released three days later.

Music video
The music video to "Strobelite" was released on 7 August 2017. It was created by Passion Pictures.

The video is set in a dance club, featuring animated band members 2-D and Noodle dancing center stage amongst a crowd of clubgoers as collaborator Peven Everett sings from the sidelines. A combination of live-action and 3D CGI shots were used to create the video, much like the music video for Gorillaz' 2010 single "Stylo". Motion capture was utilized to animate the virtual band members. The video features cameos by several Gorillaz collaborators, including Vince Staples, Posdnous of De La Soul, Savages' Jehnny Beth, Phil Cornwell, the voice of Gorillaz band member Murdoc Niccals, and Jamie Hewlett, the co-creator of Gorillaz.

Personnel
Damon Albarn – vocals, synthesizer
Peven Everett – vocals, additional keyboards
The Twilite Tone – additional vocals, synthesizer, drums, bass guitar
Remi Kabaka Jr. – drum programming
Stephen Sedgwick – sampled loops, additional drum programming, engineering, mixing engineer, recording engineer
John Davis – mastering engineer
KT Pipal – assistant
Samuel Egglenton – assistant
The Humanz (Rasul A-Salaam, Starr Busby, Melanie J-B Charles, Drea D'Nur, Giovanni James, Marcus Anthony Johnson, Janelle Kroll, Brandon Markell Holmes, Imani Vonshà) – additional vocals

Charts

References

2017 singles
Gorillaz songs
Songs written by Damon Albarn
2017 songs
Parlophone singles
Warner Records singles
British disco songs
Funk songs
British soul songs